This article is about the demographic features of the population of Mali, including population density, ethnicity, education level, health of the populace, economic status, religious affiliations and other aspects of the population.

Population 
In , Mali's population was an estimated  million, with an annual growth rate of 2.7%. This figure can be  compared to 4,638,000 in 1950. The population is predominantly rural (68% in 2002), and 5–10% of Malians are nomadic. More than 90% of the population lives in the southern part of the country, especially in Bamako, which has over 1 million residents.

In 2007, about 48% of Malians were less than 15 years old, 49% were 15–64 years old, and 3% were 65 and older. The median age was 15.9 years. The birth rate in 2007 was 49.6 births per 1,000, and the total fertility rate was 7.4 children per woman.

The death rate in 2007 was 16.5 deaths per 1,000. Life expectancy at birth was 49.5 years total (47.6 for males and 51.5 for females). Mali has one of the world's highest rates of infant mortality, with 106 deaths per 1,000 live births.

The proportion of the population aged below 15 in 2010 was 47.2%. 50.6%  of the population were aged between 15 and 65 years of age. 2.2% of the population were aged 65 years or older.

Structure of the population 

Structure of the population (01.04.2009) (Census, Complete tabulation):

Population Estimates by Sex and Age Group (01.VII.2018):

Ethnic groups 

Ethnic groups include:
 33.3% Bambara
 13.3% Fula
  9.8% Soninke
  9.6% Senufo / Bwa / Malinke
  8.7% Dogon
  5.9% Songhai
  1.7% Tuareg
  6.1% Bobo
 11.6% Others
Mali's population consists of Sub-Saharan ethnic groups, sharing similar historic, cultural, and religious traditions. Exceptions are two nomadic northern groups, the Tuaregs, a Berber people, and Maurs (or Moors), of Arabo-Berber origins. In Mali and Niger, the Moors are also known as Azawagh Arabs, named after the Azawagh region of the Sahara. Azawagh Arabs speak mainly Hassaniya Arabic which is one of the regional varieties of Arabic.

The Tuaregs traditionally have opposed the central government. Starting in June 1990 in the north, Tuaregs seeking greater autonomy led to clashes with the military. In April 1992, the government and most opposing factions signed a pact to end the fighting and restore stability in the north. Its major aims are to allow greater autonomy to the north and increase government resource allocation to what has been a traditionally impoverished region. The peace agreement was celebrated in 1996 in Timbuktu during an official and highly publicized ceremony called "Flamme de la Paix"--(peace flame).

Historically, interethnic relations throughout the rest of the country were facilitated by easy mobility on the Niger River and across the country's vast savannahs. Each ethnic group was traditionally tied to a specific occupation, all working within proximity to each other, although the distinctions were often blurred.

The Bambara, Malinké, Sarakole, Dogon and Songhay are farmers; the Fula or Fulani, Maur, and Tuareg are herders, while the Bozo are fishers. In recent years this linkage has shifted considerably, as ethnic groups seek nontraditional sources of income.

Europeans in Mali 
People of European origin form a small minority in the country. They include those of mixed European and African descendant, as well as those of full European background. The latter includes the French, as well as the Spanish, Irish, Italian and Portuguese origins. Some of them descend from the Arma people (1% of the nation's population). They mainly live in Bamako, Sikasso, Kalabancoro, Koutiala, Ségou, Kayes, Kati, Mopti, Niono, Gao, San, Koro, Bla, Bougouni, Mandé, Baguineda-Camp, Kolondiéba, Kolokani, and others.

Vital statistics 
Registration of vital events in Mali is not complete. The website Our World in Data  prepared the following estimates based on statistics from the Population Department of the United Nations.

Fertility and Births 
Total Fertility Rate (TFR) (Wanted Fertility Rate) and Crude Birth Rate (CBR):

Fertility data as of 2012-2013 (DHS Program):

Immigration and emigration 
Mali had an estimated net migration rate of –6.6 migrants per 1,000 people in 2006. About 3 million Malians are believed to reside in Côte d'Ivoire and France. Conversely, according to a 2003 estimate, Mali hosts about 11,000 Mauritanians; most are Fulani herders who routinely engage in cross-border migration. In addition, there are several thousand refugees from Côte d'Ivoire, Sierra Leone, and Liberia in Bamako and other urban areas of Mali.

Demographic statistics 
Demographic statistics according to the World Population Review in 2022.

One birth every 37 seconds	
One death every 3 minutes	
One net migrant every 13 minutes	
Net gain of one person every 51 seconds

The following demographic are from the CIA World Factbook unless otherwise indicated.

Population 
20,741,769 (2022 est.)
18,429,893 (July 2018 est.)

Age structure 

0-14 years: 47.69% (male 4,689,121/female 4,636,685)
15-24 years: 19% (male 1,768,772/female 1,945,582)
25-54 years: 26.61% (male 2,395,566/female 2,806,830)
55-64 years: 3.68% (male 367,710/female 352,170)
65 years and over: 3.02% (male 293,560/female 297,401) (2020 est.)

0-14 years: 48.03% (male 4,449,790 /female 4,402,076)
15-24 years: 18.89% (male 1,657,609 /female 1,823,453)
25-54 years: 26.36% (male 2,243,158 /female 2,615,695)
55-64 years: 3.7% (male 346,003 /female 335,733)
65 years and over: 3.02% (male 277,834 /female 278,542) (2018 est.)

Birth rate 
41.07 births/1,000 population (2022 est.) Country comparison to the world: 4th
43.2 births/1,000 population (2018 est.) Country comparison to the world: 3rd

Death rate 
8.53 deaths/1,000 population (2022 est.) Country comparison to the world: 73rd
9.6 deaths/1,000 population (2018 est.) Country comparison to the world: 45th

Total fertility rate 
5.54 children born/woman (2022 est.) Country comparison to the world: 4th
5.9 children born/woman (2018 est.) Country comparison to the world: 5th

Population growth rate 
2.95% (2022 est.) Country comparison to the world: 11th
2.98% (2018 est.) Country comparison to the world: 8th

Median age 
total: 16 years. Country comparison to the world: 224th
male: 15.3 years
female: 16.7 years (2020 est.)

total: 15.8 years. Country comparison to the world: 127th
male: 15.2 years 
female: 16.5 years (2018 est.)

Mother's mean age at first birth 
19.2 years (2018 est.)
note: median age at first birth among women 20-49

18.8 years (2012/13 est.)
note: median age at first birth among women 25-29

Contraceptive prevalence rate 
17.2% (2018)
15.6% (2015)

Net migration rate 
-3.08 migrant(s)/1,000 population (2022 est.) Country comparison to the world: 181st
-3.9 migrant(s)/1,000 population (2017 est.) Country comparison to the world: 181st

Dependency ratios 
total dependency ratio: 101.9 (2015 est.)
youth dependency ratio: 96.8 (2015 est.)
elderly dependency ratio: 5.1 (2015 est.)
potential support ratio: 19.5 (2015 est.)

Urbanization 

urban population: 45.4% of total population (2022)
rate of urbanization: 4.57% annual rate of change (2020-25 est.)

urban population: 42.4% of total population (2018)
rate of urbanization: 4.86% annual rate of change (2015-20 est.)

Life expectancy at birth 
total population: 62.41 years. Country comparison to the world: 211st
male: 60.19 years
female: 64.7 years (2022 est.)

total population: 60.8 years (2018 est.)
male: 58.6 years (2018 est.)
female: 63 years (2018 est.)

Major infectious diseases 
degree of risk: very high (2020)
food or waterborne diseases: bacterial and protozoal diarrhea, hepatitis A, and typhoid fever
vectorborne diseases: malaria and dengue fever
water contact diseases: schistosomiasis
animal contact diseases: rabies
respiratory diseases: meningococcal meningitis

Education expenditures 
3.4% of GDP (2019) Country comparison to the world: 131st

Literacy 
definition: age 15 and over can read and write (2015 est.)
total population: 35.5%
male: 46.2%
female: 25.7% (2018)

total population: 33.1% (2015 est.)
male: 45.1% (2015 est.)
female: 22.2% (2015 est.)

School life expectancy (primary to tertiary education) 
total: 7 years
male: 8 years
female: 7 years (2017)

Unemployment, youth ages 15-24 
total: 2.4%
male: 2.6%
female: 2.3% (2018 est.)

Languages 

Although each ethnic group speaks a separate language, nearly 80% of Malians communicate over ethnic borders in Bambara, which is the common language of the marketplace. French is the country's official language and is spoken somewhat by 30% of Malians.

Religion 

An estimated 95% of Malians are Sunni Muslim, 4% adhere to indigenous or traditional animist beliefs, and 1% are Christian (about two-thirds Roman Catholic and one-third Protestant). Atheism and agnosticism are believed to be rare among Malians, most of whom practice their religion on a daily basis. Islam as practiced in Mali can be moderate, tolerant, and adapted to local conditions; relations between Muslims and practitioners of minority religious faiths are generally amicable. The constitution establishes a secular state and provides for freedom of religion, and the government largely respects this right.

Health 

Mali's health and development indicators rank among the worst in the world. In 2000 only 62–65 percent of the population was estimated to have access to safe drinking water and only 69 percent to sanitation services of some kind; only 8 percent was estimated to have access to modern sanitation facilities. Only 20 percent of the nation’s villages and livestock watering holes had modern water facilities.

There were an estimated 140,000 cases of human immunodeficiency virus/acquired immune deficiency syndrome (HIV/AIDS) reported in 2003, and an estimated 1.9 percent of the adult population was afflicted with HIV/AIDS that year, among the lowest rates in Sub-Saharan Africa (see also HIV/AIDS in Africa). In the same year, there were 12,000 AIDS deaths. The infant mortality rate is 69.5 deaths/1,000 live births (75.3/1,000 among males and 63.5/1,000 among females) (2017 est.). Life expectancy at birth is 60.3 years (58.2 years among males and 62.5 years among females) (2017 est.).

Life expectancy

Education 

In the 2000–01 school year, the primary school enrollment rate was 61% (71% of males and 51% of females). The primary school completion rate is also low: only 36 percent of students in 2003 (and lower for females). The majority of students reportedly leave school by age 12. In the late 1990s, the secondary school enrollment rate was 15% percent (20% of males and 10% of females).

According to United States government estimates, the adult literacy rate (defined as those over age 15 who can read and write) was 46.4 percent for the total population in 2003 (53.5 percent for males and 39.6 percent for females). According to United Nations sources, however, the literacy rate is actually much lower—only 27–30 percent overall and as low as 12 percent for females, among the lowest rates in Africa.

References

Further reading 

.

 
Society of Mali